The 1917 New York Giants season was the franchise's 35th season. It involved the Giants winning the National League pennant for the first time in four years. The team went on to lose to the Chicago White Sox in the 1917 World Series, four games to two.

Regular season 
New York had no real superstars, but they had a very balanced roster and led the league in both runs scored and fewest runs allowed.

Third baseman Heinie Zimmerman had a fine offensive season, pacing the circuit in runs batted in, but suffered through an embarrassment in the World Series. A third baseman, Zimmerman had the unfortunate task of chasing White Sox star Eddie Collins across home plate when there was no one to throw to. The Giants lost in six games.

Between July 31 and August 10, the Giants hit at least one triple in each of 11 consecutive games, the longest such streak in franchise history (considering records from 1914 onwards).

Season standings

Record vs. opponents

Notable transactions 
 April 23, 1917: Jim Thorpe was purchased from the Giants by the Cincinnati Reds.
 August 18, 1917: Jim Thorpe was returned to the Giants by the Cincinnati Reds.

Roster

Player stats

Batting

Starters by position 
Note: Pos = Position; G = Games played; AB = At bats; H = Hits; Avg. = Batting average; HR = Home runs; RBI = Runs batted in

Other batters 
Note: G = Games played; AB = At bats; H = Hits; Avg. = Batting average; HR = Home runs; RBI = Runs batted in

Pitching

Starting pitchers 
Note: G = Games pitched; IP = Innings pitched; W = Wins; L = Losses; ERA = Earned run average; SO = Strikeouts

Other pitchers 
Note: G = Games pitched; IP = Innings pitched; W = Wins; L = Losses; ERA = Earned run average; SO = Strikeouts

Relief pitchers 
Note: G = Games pitched; W = Wins; L = Losses; SV = Saves; ERA = Earned run average; SO = Strikeouts

Awards and honors

League top five finishers 
Fred Anderson
 MLB leader in ERA (1.44)

George Burns
 NL leader in runs scored (103)
 #2 in NL in stolen bases (40)
 #3 in NL in on-base percentage (.380)

Benny Kauff
 #3 in NL in runs scored (89)
 #3 in NL in stolen bases (30)
 #4 in NL in batting average (.308)

Pol Perritt
 #3 in NL in ERA (1.88)

Dave Robertson
 MLB leader in home runs (12)

Ferdie Schupp
 #4 in NL in wins (21)
 #4 in NL in ERA (1.95)
 #4 in NL in strikeouts (147)

Heinie Zimmerman
 NL leader in RBI (102)

1917 World Series

Game 1 
October 6, 1917, at Comiskey Park in Chicago

Game 2 
October 7, 1917, at Comiskey Park in Chicago

Game 3 
October 10, 1917, at the Polo Grounds in New York City

Game 4 
October 11, 1917, at the Polo Grounds in New York City

Game 5 
October 13, 1917, at Comiskey Park in Chicago

Game 6 
October 15, 1917, at the Polo Grounds in New York City

References

External links
1917 New York Giants season at Baseball Reference

New York Giants (NL)
San Francisco Giants seasons
New York Giants season
National League champion seasons
New York G
1910s in Manhattan
Washington Heights, Manhattan